Nieman may refer to:
An alternative name for Neman river
Nieman (surname)
Nieman Fellowship
Nieman R-10, Soviet aircraft